Brian Blackburn (15 October 1928 – 30 May 2014) was an Australian gymnast. He competed in eight events at the 1956 Summer Olympics.

References

External links
 

1928 births
2014 deaths
Australian male artistic gymnasts
Olympic gymnasts of Australia
Gymnasts at the 1956 Summer Olympics
Place of birth missing